Miller v R [1977] 2 SCR 680 is a Canadian Bill of Rights decision of the Supreme Court of Canada where the Criminal Code provisions relating to the death penalty were challenged as a violation of the right against "cruel and unusual" punishment under section 2(b) of the Bill of Rights.

Justice Laskin, for the majority, upheld the laws. He interpreted the phrase "cruel and unusual" in the context of its origin in the English Bill of Rights and the US Eighth Amendment, which only limited the means of carrying out a death sentence.

Some of the definition given to cruel and unusual punishments in this case later shaped the jurisprudence carried out under section 12 of the Canadian Charter of Rights and Freedoms.

See also
 List of Supreme Court of Canada cases

External links
 Full text available at Canlii.org  and Lexum 

Supreme Court of Canada cases
Supreme Court of Canada case articles without infoboxes
1977 in Canadian case law
Death penalty case law
Canadian criminal case law